"Maximal Crazy" is a song by Dutch DJ Tiësto. It was released on 5 September 2011 in the Netherlands, United Kingdom and Finland. The single was released in the United States and Canada on iTunes on 20 September 2011. It is the first single from the Tiësto mixed compilation Club Life, Vol. 2 - Miami.

Music video
The music video premiered on Tiësto's official YouTube Channel on 4 September 2011. The video was shot at Electric Daisy Carnival in Las Vegas, an event that perfectly summed up the title and the spirit of the song. The video begins with Tiësto in a helicopter flying over Las Vegas. The remainder of the video is "Crazy" scenes from the festival.

Track listings
Digital download (MF008)
 "Maximal Crazy" (Original Mix) - 6:49

CD (MF008)
 "Maximal Crazy" (Radio Edit) - 4:16
 "Maximal Crazy" (Original Mix) - 6:49
 "Maximal Crazy" (Bassjackers Remix) - 6:02
 "Maximal Crazy" (R3HAB & Swanky Tunes Remix) - 7:00

Remixes (MF010)
 "Maximal Crazy" (Bassjackers Remix) - 6:02
 "Maximal Crazy" (R3HAB & Swanky Tunes Remix) - 7:00

2017 Translucent Yellow 7"
 "Maximal Crazy" (Original Mix) - 6:49
 "Maximal Crazy" (Radio Edit) - 4:16

Charts

References

2011 singles
Tiësto songs
Songs written by Tiësto